Mohmil is the name given to meaningless words in Urdu, Hindustani and other Indo-Aryan languages, used mostly for generalization purposes. The mohmil word usually directly follows (but sometimes precedes) the meaningful word that is generalized. The mohmil word usually rhymes with the meaningful word, or shares the same consonants.

Some common examples of mohmil words:

See also
Placeholder name

References

Urdu
Hindi
Word coinage
Reduplication